Madia exigua is a species of flowering plant in the family Asteraceae known by the common names small tarweed and threadstem madia.

Range
Madia exigua is native to western North America from British Columbia to Baja California, where it grows in many types of dry habitat outside the deserts.

Description
Madia exigua is an aromatic annual herb growing up to half a meter (20") tall, its slender stem coated with hairs, large stalked resin glands, and sometimes bristles. The rough-haired leaves are 1 to 4 centimeters (0.4 to 1.6") long.

The inflorescence is an array of clustered flower heads on thin, stiff peduncles. Each head has an involucre of phyllaries shaped like a top. The phyllaries are coated in knobby yellow resin glands. At the tip of the inflorescence are minute yellowish ray florets each under a millimeter long, and one or two yellow disc florets. The fruit is an achene with no pappus.

External links
Jepson Manual Treatment: Madia exigua
USDA Plants Profile: Madia exigua
Flora of North America: Madia exigua
Madia exigua — U.C. Photo gallery

exigua
Flora of Baja California
Flora of British Columbia
Flora of California
Flora of Oregon
Flora of Washington (state)
Flora of the Cascade Range
Flora of the Klamath Mountains
Flora of the Sierra Nevada (United States)
Natural history of the California chaparral and woodlands
Natural history of the California Coast Ranges
Natural history of the Central Valley (California)
Natural history of the Channel Islands of California
Natural history of the Peninsular Ranges
Natural history of the San Francisco Bay Area
Natural history of the Santa Monica Mountains
Natural history of the Transverse Ranges
Flora without expected TNC conservation status